John Inglis (17 June 1859 – 16 August 1920) was a Scottish footballer who played as a forward.

Career
Inglis played club football for Partick and Rangers in Scotland, and for Blackburn Rovers (winning the FA Cup in 1884 during a spell of only a few months at the club), Great Lever and Preston North End in England (also making guest appearances for Blackburn Olympic and Preston Swifts).

He made two appearances for Scotland in 1883 while with Rangers.

References

1859 births
1920 deaths
Scottish footballers
Scotland international footballers
People from Kilwinning
Footballers from North Ayrshire
Partick F.C. players
Rangers F.C. players
Blackburn Olympic F.C. players
Preston North End F.C. players
Blackburn Rovers F.C. players
Great Lever F.C. players
Association football forwards
FA Cup Final players